Castelnau-de-Lévis is a commune in the Tarn department in southern France.

It is located just west of Albi. The inhabitants are Castellévisiens.

Monuments and sites
 Chateau de Castelnau-de-Lévis is a ruined castle dating from the 13th and 15th centuries.

Motocross
The village at the base of the château is the site of a motocross championship, the Championnats du Monde MX3 et d’Europe 125 de Motocross. The track is also scheduled to host the French 2009 Sidecarcross world championship Grand Prix on 29 March 2009, however, this will still have to be confirmed by the FIM.

See also
 Communes of the Tarn department
 Tourism in Tarn

References

External links

Communes of Tarn (department)